Abel Rey (29 December 1873, Chalon-sur-Saône – 13 January 1940, Paris) was a French philosopher and historian of science.

Abel Rey succeeded Gaston Milhaud as professor of the history of philosophy in its relation to science at the Sorbonne, and established the Institut d'histoire des sciences et des techniques to encourage cooperation between the sciences and humanities. It has been argued that Rey influenced Philipp Frank and the formation of the Vienna Circle.  Rey's history of science was wide, including sciences from physics to sociology, and deep, ranging from antiquity to the present; moreover, it included the study of culture's influence on the sciences of the time.

Works
L'énergétique et le mécanisme au point de vue des conditions de la connaissance, Paris, F. Alcan, 1905 (reprinted 1923)
La théorie de la physique chez les physiciens contemporains, 1907
La philosophie moderne, éd. Flammarion, 1908
La science dans l'antiquité, dans L'évolution de l'humanité, vols. 1-5
 La Science orientale avant les Grecs (1930)
 La jeunesse de la science grecque (1933)
 La maturité de la pensée scientifique en Grèce (1939)
 L'apogée de la science technique grecque : les sciences de la nature ; les mathématiques d'Hippocrate à Platon (1939)
 L'apogée de la science technique grecque : l'essor des mathématiques (posthume, 1946)
Psychologie, 1934
Les mathématiques en Grèce, au milieu du Ve siècle, 1935

References

1873 births
1940 deaths
20th-century essayists
20th-century French non-fiction writers
20th-century French philosophers
Epistemologists
20th-century French historians
French male essayists
French male non-fiction writers
Historians of philosophy
Historians of science
Philosophers of culture
Philosophers of history
Philosophers of science
Philosophy academics
Philosophy writers